Bruki Unisławskie  is a village in the administrative district of Gmina Unisław, within Chełmno County, Kuyavian-Pomeranian Voivodeship, in north-central Poland.

References

Villages in Chełmno County